Otto Wiener may refer to:
 Otto Wiener (baritone)
 Otto Wiener (physicist)